Üçüncü Beynəlmiləl (also, Internatsional and Tretiy Internatsional) is a village in the Shamkir Rayon of Azerbaijan.

References 

Populated places in Shamkir District